Emilie Alba Paltrinieri (born 1 October 2001) is an Italian amateur golfer. In 2016 she won The R&A's Girls Amateur Championship.

Amateur career
Paltrinieri was born in Paris, France, before her family moved to Milan, Italy when she was a young child. She has been a member of the Italian National Team since age 11, helping her home country to victories at the 2016 and 2018 European Girls' Team Championships and the 2018 World Junior Girls Championship in Canada.

She played in the 2016 Junior Golf World Cup in Japan and the 2018 Espirito Santo Trophy in Ireland. She was a member of the European Junior Ryder Cup team in 2016 and 2018, and at the 2017 Junior Vagliano Trophy.

In 2016, Paltrinieri won Girls Amateur Championship and in 2020 she reached the semi-finals of The Womens Amateur Championship.

In 2018, she captured the Italian double, winning both the Italian Ladies' Match Play and the Italian Ladies' Stroke Play Championship. The following year she won the German Girls Open.

In the fall of 2019, Paltrinieri enrolled at UCLA and started playing with the UCLA Bruins women's golf team.

Paltrinieri played in the European Tour's first full-field mixed professional tournament, the 2019 Jordan Mixed Open, where she made the cut. In the 2020 Omega Dubai Moonlight Classic, a Ladies European Tour event, she finished 16th.

Amateur wins
2014 (1) Gran Premio Vecchio Monastero
2016 (2) Italian Ladies Match Play (Giuseppe Silva Trophy), Girls Amateur Championship
2018 (2) Italian Ladies Match Play (Giuseppe Silva Trophy), Italian Ladies Stroke Play Championship (Isa Goldschmid Trophy)
2019 (1) German Girls Open

Source:

Team appearances
Amateur
European Girls' Team Championship (representing Italy): 2015, 2016 (winners), 2017, 2018 (winners), 2019
European Ladies' Team Championship (representing Italy): 2021, 2022
Junior Golf World Cup: (representing Italy): 2016
Junior Ryder Cup (representing Europe): 2016, 2018
Junior Vagliano Trophy: (representing the Continent of Europe): 2017 (winners)
World Junior Girls Championship (representing Italy): 2018 (winners)
Espirito Santo Trophy (representing Italy): 2018

Source:

References

External links

Emilie Alba Paltrinieri on the World Amateur Golf Ranking official site
Emilie Paltrinieri on the UCLA Bruins official site

Italian female golfers
UCLA Bruins women's golfers
Sportspeople from Milan
2001 births
Living people